Wilcannia is a small town located within the Central Darling Shire in north western New South Wales, Australia. Located on the Darling River, the town was the third largest inland port in the country during the river boat era of the mid-19th century.

Predominantly populated by Aboriginal Australians, Wilcannia has received national and international attention for government deprivation of its community's needs, and the low life expectancy of its residents. For indigenous men, that figure is 37 years of age. The town has been one of the worst hit by the COVID-19 pandemic in New South Wales, and the government's refusal to ban tourists from the area to preserve the health of its struggling residents has been met with condemnation.

History
The area lies in the traditional lands of the Barkindji people, who call the river "Baaka". The name Wilcannia is said to be derived from an indigenous term for either "gap in the bank where floodwaters escape" or "wild dog". Neither meaning has been linguistically verified.

In 1835, explorer Major Thomas Mitchell was the first European to reach the region, when he traced the Darling River to what is now Menindee. 

In late January 1859, Captain Francis Cadell, in charge of the river boat Albury, entered the Darling River at its junction with the Murray and, after eight days travel, reached the Mount Murchison pastoral station, held by Hugh and Bushby Jamieson.  Flour and other stores were delivered to the station and one hundred bales of wool were loaded for the return journey. Cadell's pioneering journey was the beginning of river boat transport on the Darling River (when river conditions allowed). The site of the future township developed as the location for the unloading and loading of river-borne cargo.  The settlement was initially known as Mount Murchison, taking its name from the nearby pastoral run. As economic activity increased, the location attracted business and trades providing services and amenities to the surrounding stations.

In June 1866, the New South Wales Department of Lands formally declared "portions of Crown Lands" to be set apart as a site for the town of Wilcannia. Despite the official proclamation, the older name for the settlement persisted. In March 1867, a correspondent from the town wrote that: "the township of Mount Murchison is fast springing into importance, owing to the splendid country surrounding it, and which is fast being taken up for pastoral pursuits. We have public houses, stores, butchers' shops, boarding houses, a cordial manufactory in full operation, and a colonial ale brewery in course of erection".

In 1871, the population of Wilcannia was 264, consisting of 176 males and 88 females. In January 1874, the township's first newspaper, the Wilcannia Times, began publication. 

An account of Wilcannia in December 1874 described the buildings in the town as "on the whole being of a very poor description, principally small weatherboard places, many of them looking rather dilapidated".  Three stores were operating in the township, as well as three public houses: the Mount Murchison Hotel, Wilcannia Hotel and Britannia Hotel. There were signs of increased commercial activity in the township: two banks, the Australian Joint Stock Bank and the Commercial Bank, had recently opened branches, and four stock and station agents had started businesses "within the last three months". However, there was no telegraph office, "the want of which is sorely felt by the business people of the town, and in fact the whole district". Wilcannia had a public school, but no churches. There were two doctors, "but as it is a very rare thing to find them otherwise than drunk, they are worse than useless".

In December 1880, a second local newspaper, the Western Grazier, began publication in Wilcannia. By early 1881 patients were being treated in the newly built local hospital. At the census of 1881 the population of Wilcannia was recorded as 1,424 (976 males and 448 females). Wilcannia was incorporated as a municipality in February 1883, with Edmond O'Donnell elected its first mayor. The first major project of the municipality was the construction of water supply system for the township. A July 1884 report stated that Wilcannia had a population "of about 1200", and was described as a township "of well-laid-out streets and good buildings", situated "in the centre of a large sheep country".  The Post and Telegraph Office was reported to be "a handsome building" and several of the stores ("notably Frew, Wright, and Co., J. Palmer and Co., and Cramsie, Bowden, and Co.") were described as "not only extensive but of considerable architectural beauty".  It was explained that a quarry of freestone "of excellent quality", within  of the township "has been largely used for building purposes". The only local industry of note was a brewery.

Wilcannia was the location of a Customs station on the Darling River.  It was described as a "large and important centre of trade, where in 1881 £13,100 was collected as Customs revenue". The river trade during the 1880s was so extensive at Wilcannia that its Customs House was "probably the largest inland Customs Station in New South Wales".

When river conditions permitted travel by steamers Wilcannia was a major port on the Darling River. A visitor to the town described the river scene in 1890:
There are several wharves (so-called) which were merely graduated slopes cut out of the river bank, and in the wool season the river, in their vicinity, is thronged with steamers and barges, waiting for or unloading the season's clip, for the bulk of it goes away either to Bourke, for Sydney, or to Wentworth, or Goolwa. A barge, laden with from 1,200 to 2,000 bales of wool is a pretty sight; and a still more interesting spectacle is a string of 30 or 40 camels, each carrying two bales, proceeding into town from some far back station.

At the time of the 1891 census the municipality of Wilcannia had a non-Aboriginal population of 1,287 (775 males and 512 females).

Vehicles and stock were crossed over the Darling River at Wilcannia by a punt operated by Charles Smith until the mid-1890s. In 1895 a bridge was constructed at Wilcannia and opened to traffic in January 1896.  The bridge consisted of five spans, a total length of 310 feet (94.5 metres) with a centre lift span "to permit of steamers passing when the river is high".

In January 1917 it was reported that the Wilcannia Hospital was "without a doctor".  The hospital was "full of patients, some diphtheria cases among them, and the Matron is having a very hard and anxious time".

In December 1939 Wilcannia was described as "merely a shopping centre for the wide district, although people travelling into Queensland and lonely sections of New South Wales often rest there". At the 2020 ARIA Music Awards, Wilcannia Central School's Sarah Donnelley won Music Teacher of the Year.

Geography 
Wilcannia is located where the Barrier Highway crosses the Darling River,  from Sydney. Wilcannia is located within the Darling Riverine Plains Bioregion (IBRA classification, Department of Environment), consisting of landscapes adapted to flooding. Common species include River Red Gum, Yellow Box, Oldman Saltbush and Lignum.

The surrounding area is very sparsely settled by pastoralists who have large land holdings, used primarily to run sheep. These holdings fall in the Western Division and the majority are held as 99-year leases.

Climate
Wilcannia has a hot desert climate (BWh) under the Köppen climate classification, featuring very hot, dry summers and short, cool winters.

This was during the severe heatwave of January 1939.

Significant weather
On 9 November 1950, a severe thunderstorm with damaging winds and large hail the size of cricket balls struck the town. Two people were injured, dozens of homes lost their roofs and nearly every house in town was damaged due to the large hail.

Demography 
From the 2016 Census, Wilcannia had a population of 549 with 407 (74.4%) people being of Aboriginal or Torres Strait Islander descent, mostly from the Barkindji nation. Wilcannia has 223 private dwellings. The town was listed as one of the most socially disadvantaged areas of New South Wales according to the 2015 Dropping Off The Edge report.

Media 
The town's social issues were highlighted in the BBC3 documentary Reggie Yates: Hidden Australia "Episode 1: Black in the Outback", first broadcast online on 16 January 2017. In March 2017 the BBC, in response to complaints about the biased and misleading view portrayed, investigated the claims and suspended the production company pending the outcome of the review. In June 2017 the suspension was confirmed for 6 months, covering all new commissions and development. "It was a serious breach of the BBC's Editorial Guidelines and the high standards of accuracy and fairness we expect of programme makers," the BBC Trust stated. The BBC and Sundog both issued apologies.

In 2017, in a counter-response, ABC Radio National highlighted Wilcannia's other non-negative social aspects in a 6-part series called "Positively Wilcannia" by The Real Thing.

During the COVID-19 pandemic, multiple media outlets highlighted how poor living conditions and overcrowding in houses in Wilcannia resulted in the town having Australia's highest per-capita case rate, with one-sixth of residents testing positive to the virus; about 90% of them were Aboriginal. A parliamentary inquiry into New South Wales' handling of the pandemic was told that community leaders warned authorities a year earlier about how Wilcannia's overcrowding situation could lead to a crisis if the virus entered the town.

Notable people 

 Annie Moysey, known as Wilcannia's Grandmother.
 The Wilcannia Mob, a hip-hop musical group of five Indigenous Australians.

 'Uncle' Owen Whyman, initiator of political party Indigenous-Aboriginal Party of Australia (2021).

Gallery

See also
 Wilcannia Athenaeum
 List of extreme temperatures in Australia

Notes

References

External links

Visit NSW Wilcannia

 – a Desert Pea Media community project with a group of young Indigenous people enrolled at Wilcannia High School, and a group of community leaders from Wilcannia and Broken Hill.

Towns in New South Wales
Populated places on the Darling River
River ports of Australia
Central Darling Shire